Scutogyrus vanhovei is a species of monopisthocotylean monogenean in the family Dactylogyridae. It is known to Tilapia species, particularly Tilapia mariae, and was first found in Cameroon. It can be differentiated from its cogenerates by the presence of a distinct swollen portion of its penis.

References

Monopisthocotylea